Jack A. Langedijk (born 1956) is a Canadian actor, theatre director, and author.

Education 
Langedijk studied acting at Concordia University in Montreal and Sheridan College in Ontario.

Career 
After graduation from university, Langedijk founded his own theater company and worked in this industry as a director for many stage performances, including often by Shakespeare.

In addition to his work in the theater, he is also active as a fictitious performer in many films and television series. He has, inter alia, smaller appearances in film productions such as Darkman II: The Return of Durant (1995) and episodes of series such as Relic Hunter and Mutant X.

He received a Gemini Award nomination for Best Actor in a Leading Role in a Dramatic Program or Mini-Series at the 5th Gemini Awards in 1990, for his performance as Joseph Brant in the television film Divided Loyalties.

Langedijk self-published his first novel, Because, in 2014.

Filmography

Film

Television

References

External links 
 

Canadian male stage actors
Canadian male novelists
1956 births
Living people
Canadian male film actors
Canadian male television actors
Canadian male voice actors
20th-century Canadian male actors
21st-century Canadian male actors
21st-century Canadian novelists
Canadian theatre directors